Never Not Together is the ninth studio album by American band Nada Surf. It was released on February 7, 2020 under Barsuk Records.

Critical reception
Never Not Together was met with generally favorable reviews from critics. At Metacritic, which assigns a weighted average rating out of 100 to reviews from mainstream publications, this release received an average score of 80, based on 9 reviews.

Track listing

Charts

References

2020 albums
Barsuk Records albums
Nada Surf albums